Problepsis minuta is a moth of the family Geometridae. It is found in Japan.

References

Moths described in 1958
Scopulini
Moths of Japan